James Greenwood may refer to:

 James Greenwood (grammarian) (died 1737), English grammarian
 James Greenwood (journalist) (1832–1929), British social explorer, journalist and writer
 James Greenwood (cricketer) (1806–1870), amateur English cricketer
 James C. Greenwood (born 1951), known as Jim, American politician in the Republican Party
 Jim Greenwood (rugby union) (1929–2010), Scottish international rugby union player
 James Greenwood (rugby league) (born 1991), rugby league player
 James Greenwood (Australian politician) (1838–1882), New South Wales politician